The Faulknor class were a class of flotilla leaders that were under construction in the United Kingdom for the Chilean Navy at the outbreak of World War I. Six ships were ordered by Chile, of which the first two (Almirante Lynch and Almirante Condell) were delivered to Chile before the outbreak of the war. The remaining four ships were purchased by the British,  taken over and completed for the Royal Navy for wartime service. In common with Royal Navy convention, they were named after famous Royal Navy captains of the past, in this case the members of the Faulknor family.

Design
The six s were a private design by J. Samuel White that were significantly larger and heavier armed than their contemporaries. They had four funnels, a tall, narrow fore funnel and three broad, short funnels behind. They were initially armed with six single QF 4-inch guns, unusually arranged with four on the forecastle - two sited in front of the wheelhouse and two sited abreast it - the remaining pair being sited on the quarterdeck. These guns were of a novel Elswick design for the Chileans and when the ships were rearmed they were replaced with standard Royal Navy models. As rearmed in 1918 they carried a BL 4.7-inch gun on the forecastle and another on a bandstand between the after pair of funnels, retained the pair of  guns abreast the wheelhouse and had two QF 2-pounder pom-poms.

Compared to other Royal Navy ships, the class was noted for the lavish officer's accommodations ordered by the Chileans. This included silver-plated chandeliers in the captain's quarters.

One of the four ships taken over by the Royal Navy was sunk in 1916, but the other three were returned to the friendly nation of Chile in 1920, at which point the Thornycroft type leader Rooke was renamed Broke to maintain this famous name (that of Admiral Sir Philip Bowes Vere Broke of the Shannon) in the Navy List.

Service
All of the class were present at the Battle of Jutland on 31 May to 1 June 1916 where Broke collided with and sank the Acasta-class destroyer Sparrowhawk. Also in this action, Tipperary, serving with the 4th Destroyer Flotilla, was hit by 5.9-inch (150 mm) fire from the secondary battery of the German dreadnought Westfalen and sank with the loss of 185 hands from her crew of 197.

In April 1917, Broke took part in an action known as the Battle of Dover Strait with equally large singleton Swift during which she was damaged.

Botha was damaged in the English Channel on 21 March 1918 off the coast of Flanders when she rammed and sank the German torpedo boat A-19 and was then torpedoed in error by the French destroyer Capitaine Mehl.

Ships

See also

Almirante Lynch-class destroyers for details after return to Chile.

Citations

Bibliography

Destroyer classes
 
Ship classes of the Royal Navy

de:Faulknor-Klasse
fr:Classe Almirante Lynch